Pongalur is a legislative assembly constituency in Coimbatore district, which includes the city, Pongalur. Pongalur assembly constituency was part of Pollachi Parliamentary constituency.

Members of the Legislative Assembly

Election results

2006

2001

1996

1991

1989

1984

1980

1977

1971

1967

References

External links
 

Former assembly constituencies of Tamil Nadu
Coimbatore district